The fifth season of the American military drama television series SEAL Team premiered on October 10, 2021, on CBS, for the 2021–22 television season for four episodes. Afterwards, the rest of the season moved to Paramount+. The season concluded on January 23, 2022.

SEAL Team follows an elite unit of United States Navy SEALs portrayed by David Boreanaz, Max Thieriot, Neil Brown Jr., A. J. Buckley, and Toni Trucks. 

Despite airing only the first four episodes on CBS, the fifth season of SEAL Team ranked #42 with a total of 5.83 million viewers. The season was also the most-watched on Paramount+.

Cast and characters

Main 
 David Boreanaz as Master Chief Special Warfare Operator Jason Hayes a.k.a. Bravo 1/1B
 Max Thieriot as Special Warfare Operator Second Class Clay Spenser a.k.a. Bravo 6/6B
 Neil Brown Jr. as Chief Warrant Officer 2 Raymond "Ray" Perry a.k.a. Bravo 2/2B
 A. J. Buckley as Special Warfare Operator First Class Sonny Quinn a.k.a. Bravo 3/3B
 Toni Trucks as Lieutenant (junior grade) Lisa Davis

Recurring 
 Tyler Grey as Special Warfare Operator First Class Trent Sawyer a.k.a. Bravo 4/4B
 Justin Melnick as Special Warfare Operator First Class Brock Reynolds a.k.a. Bravo 5/5B
 Alona Tal as Stella Baxter
 Kerri Medders as Emma Hayes
 Parisa Fakhri as Naima Perry
 C. Thomas Howell as Ash Spenser
 Maximiliano Hernández as Carl Dryden
 Mike Wade as Wes Soto
 Rachel Boston as Hannah Oliver

Guest 
 Judd Lormand as Commander Eric Blackburn
 Shawn Hatosy as Marc Lee
 Note:

Episodes 

The number in the "No. overall" column refers to the episode's number within the overall series, whereas the number in the "No. in season" column refers to the episode's number within this particular season. "Production code" refers to the order in which the episodes were produced while "U.S. viewers (millions)" refers to the number of viewers in the U.S. in millions who watched the episode as it was aired.

Production 
On May 14, 2021, it was reported the series was undergoing talks to move to the streaming service Paramount+ if renewed for a fifth season; if a deal were reached, the series would air some of its fifth season episodes on CBS before moving to Paramount+. Four days later, the deal was finalized.

Release
On May 19, 2021, it was announced that the series would air the first four episodes on Sundays at 10:00 PM ET timeslot after NCIS: Los Angeles. On July 12, 2021, it was revealed that the season would premiere on October 10, 2021. Afterwards, the later ten episodes would stream on Paramount+.

On November 1, following its fourth and final CBS episode, the series made its debut on Paramount+, releasing its fifth episode.

Reception

CBS ratings

Notes

References 

2021 American television seasons
2022 American television seasons